György Katona (born 23 January 1988 in Mátészalka) is a Hungarian football player who currently plays for Füzesgyarmati SK.

References
 Player profile at HLSZ 
 

1988 births
Living people
People from Mátészalka
Hungarian footballers
Association football midfielders
Kaposvári Rákóczi FC players
Nyíregyháza Spartacus FC players
Cigánd SE players
Szolnoki MÁV FC footballers
Nyírbátori FC players
Nemzeti Bajnokság II players
Nemzeti Bajnokság I players
Sportspeople from Szabolcs-Szatmár-Bereg County